John (Jack) Murray (8 July 1851 – 4 May 1916), Australian politician, was the 23rd premier of Victoria.

Biography
Murray was born near Koroit, Victoria, the son of James Murray (died 1885) and his wife Isabella, née Gordon, both Scottish immigrants. When Murray was a child his parents settled on a farm, Glenample station, at Port Campbell in the Western District of Victoria. Murray attended Allansford National School and, from 1868, Henry Kemmis's Warrnambool Grammar School. Murray visited Britain when around 20 years of age and was horrified by the poverty he saw there; but returned to Victoria. Murray inherited the farm and lived there all his life. On 4 April 1888 Murray married Alice Jane Bateman at Warrnambool, eventually having six children.

In 1883 Murray opposed James Francis for Warrnambool in the Victorian Legislative Assembly, but was defeated. Francis died in 1884, Murray obtained the vacant seat and held it until his death 32 years later. Murray was often opposed, and in his early days his indulgence in alcohol threatened his career. Murray overcame this weakness and afterwards as an advocate of temperance did not hesitate to mention the danger he had been in. A typical rural conservative, he was Chief Secretary and Minister for Labour in the government of William Irvine from 1902 to 1904, and President of the Board of Land and Works and Commissioner of Crown Lands in the government of Thomas Bent from 1904 to 1906. After 1907, however, Murray emerged as the leader of a country faction of Bent's Liberal Party which opposed his free-spending policies. In January 1909 he successfully moved a motion of no-confidence in Bent's government and succeeded him as Premier, also becoming Chief Secretary and Minister for Labour.

Murray was chief secretary in 1902-04 and from 1909 formal chairman of the Board for the Protection of Aborigines.

Although the Labor Party won the 1910 federal elections, it remained much weaker in Victoria than in other states, and at the 1911 state elections Murray's Liberals were re-elected with 43 seats to Labor's 20. But conflict between rural and urban factions of the Liberal Party remained chronic, with the urban leader William Watt undermining Murray just as Murray had undermined Bent. By May 1912 Murray had had enough and resigned. He then accepted office as Chief Secretary in Watt's government from 1912 to 1913 and again from 1913 to 1915. Murray died in Warrnambool on 4 May 1916 after his trap-pony had bolted.

Murray was physically a big man, good-natured and well-read, an excellent speaker who used humour and irony. An able administrator with a tendency to indolence, he was a good leader in the house, often turning the laugh against his opponents, and managing difficult measures with much tact and success.

References

Geoff Browne, A Biographical Register of the Victorian Parliament, 1900-84, Government Printer, Melbourne, 1985
Don Garden, Victoria: A History, Thomas Nelson, Melbourne, 1984
Kathleen Thompson and Geoffrey Serle, A Biographical Register of the Victorian Parliament, 1856-1900, Australian National University Press, Canberra, 1972
 Raymond Wright, A People's Counsel. A History of the Parliament of Victoria, 1856-1990, Oxford University Press, Melbourne, 1992

1851 births
1916 deaths
Premiers of Victoria
Members of the Victorian Legislative Assembly
Victoria (Australia) state politicians
Australian people of Scottish descent
Victorian Ministers for Agriculture